George Wilkins (died 1618) was an English dramatist and pamphleteer.

George Wilkins may also refer to:

 George Wilkins (priest) (1785–1865), English Anglican priest
 George Wilkins (footballer) (1919–1999), English footballer
 George Wilkins family, his 4 sons who played professional football, including Ray Wilkins
 George Wilkins (Vermont politician) (1817–1902), Vermont attorney and politician
 Sir (George) Hubert Wilkins (1888–1958), Australian polar explorer, pilot, soldier, geographer and photographer
 George Wilkins (composer), American music composer and arranger